The Rural Municipality of Insinger No. 275 is a rural municipality (RM) in the Canadian province of Saskatchewan within Census Division No. 9 and  Division No. 4. It is located in the east-central portion of the province.

History 
The RM of Insinger No. 275 incorporated as a rural municipality on January 1, 1913.

Geography

Communities and localities 
The following urban municipalities are surrounded by the RM.

Villages
 Sheho
 Theodore

The following unincorporated communities are within the RM.

Localities
 Goldenvale
 Insinger
 Stonyview

Demographics 

Government 
The RM of Insinger No. 275 is governed by an elected municipal council and an appointed administrator that meets on the second Wednesday of every month. The reeve of the RM is Willy Zuchkan while its administrator is Sonya Butuk. The RM's office is located in Insinger.

References 

I

Division No. 9, Saskatchewan